Frederick Payne (12 January 1908 – 31 July 1992) was a South African cricket umpire. He stood in one Test match, South Africa vs. New Zealand, in 1954.

See also
 List of Test cricket umpires

References

1908 births
1992 deaths
People from Port Elizabeth
South African Test cricket umpires